Oxford Township is a township in Jones County, Iowa.

History
Oxford Township was organized in 1855.

References

Populated places in Jones County, Iowa
Townships in Iowa